Philippe Close (born 18 March 1971 in Namur) is a Belgian politician, member of the Socialist Party and the current mayor of the city of Brussels (since 2017).

Biography
Close has a law degree from Université libre de Bruxelles. In 2000, he became Elio Di Rupo's spokesman before joining the City of Brussels in 2001, as the chief of staff of Mayor Freddy Thielemans.

In 2006, he was elected to the Brussels City Council, after which he became alderman.

In 2009, he was elected as member of the Brussels Parliament.

In 2013, he was considered as successor to Brussels Mayor Freddy Thielemans (PS), but the office went to Yvan Mayeur (PS). Following financial scandals in 2017, Mayeur resigned and was succeeded by Close.

References

Mayors of the City of Brussels
Socialist Party (Belgium) politicians
1971 births
Living people
21st-century Belgian politicians
Université libre de Bruxelles alumni